Guerrillas and Generals is a book written by American Paul H. Lewis. Its subject is the history of Argentina from the 1970s to some years ago. It talks about the Dirty War in Argentina and the trials of Jorge Rafael Videla and other military rulers of Argentina.

Reception
Donald C. Hodges of Florida State University, reviewing the book in Political Science Quarterly, claims that Lewis holds a bias against the guerrillas. He notes, however, that except for the omission of Abraham Guillén the book is a "well documented study".

Ruth Stanley of the Free University of Berlin, in a review of the book for the Journal of Third World Studies, claims that Lewis "appears to believe that guerrilleros who were tortured and disappeared got what they deserved". The review concludes by opining that

References

History books about Argentina
2002 non-fiction books
Dirty War